Hoch or Höch is a surname. Notable people with the surname include:

Adolf Hoch (1910–1992), Austrian architect
August Hoch (1868–1919), Swiss-born American psychiatrist
Beverly Hoch (born 1951), American opera singer
Daniel Hoch (born 1979), Swedish soccer player
Daniel K. Hoch (1866-1960), American politician
Danny Hoch (born 1970), American actor and writer
Edward D. Hoch (1930–2008), American writer
Edward W. Hoch (1849–1925), American politician
Eva-Maria Hoch (born 1984), Austrian tennis player
Gottfried Höch (1800–1872), German official
Hannah Höch (1889–1978), German artist
Harry Hoch (1887–1981), American baseball player
Heinrich Theodor Höch (1845–1905), German businessman
Homer Hoch (1879–1949), American politician
Hugó Hoch (fl. 1900), Hungarian fencer
James Hoch, microbiologist
James Hoch (poet), American poet
Johann Otto Hoch (1855–1906), German-born American murderer
Joseph Hoch (1815–1874), German lawyer
Lambert Anthony Hoch (1903–1990), American bishop
Matthew Hoch (born 1975), American academic
Preben Hoch (1925–2014), Danish rower
Scott Hoch (born 1955), American golfer
Winton C. Hoch (1905–1979), American cinematographer
Robert Maxwell (1923–1991), Czechoslovakian-born British media proprietor and politician, born Ján Ludvík Hyman Binyamin Hoch

See also
 Hock (disambiguation)
 Hooch (disambiguation)